Barnton railway station served the village of Barnton, Edinburgh, Scotland from 1894 to 1951 on the Barnton Branch.

History 
The station opened as Cramond Brig on 1 March 1894 by the Caledonian Railway. To the north was a goods yard which had a loading bank and a goods shed. The signal box, which opened with the station, was to the east. After Barnton village was developed, the station's name was changed to Barnton on 1 April 1903. The station closed on 7 May 1951.

References

External links 

Disused railway stations in Edinburgh
Former Caledonian Railway stations
Railway stations in Great Britain opened in 1894
Railway stations in Great Britain closed in 1951
1894 establishments in Scotland
1951 disestablishments in Scotland